Merrill Skolnik (November 6, 1927-January 27, 2022) was an American researcher in the area of radar systems and the author or editor of a number of standard texts in the field. He is best known for his introductory text "Introduction to Radar Systems" and for editing the "Radar Handbook". 

From 1965 to his retirement in 1996, he worked for the Naval Research Laboratory (NRL) in the US.  Earlier in his career, he worked with the Institute for Defense Analyses, MIT Lincoln Laboratory, and the Johns Hopkins Radiation Laboratory, among other organizations. He is a Fellow of the IEEE and was editor of the Proceedings of the IEEE. In 2000, he was the first recipient of the IEEE Dennis J. Picard Medal for Radar Technologies and Applications. In 1986, he was elected a member of the National Academy of Engineering for contributions to the advancement of radar, and for leadership in radar engineering research and development.

References

Further Reading

Geselowitz, Michael. "Oral-History:Merrill Skolnik." IEEE Global History Network. IEEE, 22 Feb. 2000. Web. 06 Apr. 2014. <http://www.ieeeghn.org/wiki/index.php/Oral-History%3AMerrill_Skolnik>.

NRL. "Dr. Skolnik Receives Picard Medal." U.S. Naval Research Laboratory. NRL, 15 June 2000. Web. 06 Apr. 2014. <http://www.nrl.navy.mil/media/news-releases/2000/dr-skolnik-receives-picard-medal>.

Perry, Tekla S. "Famous First Jobs: Seven Leading Engineers Tell about Their First Professional Jobs, Their Reasons for Choosing Them, and How Those Choices Affected Their Careers." IEEE Spectrum 24.7 (1987): 44-51. Includes a section on Dr. Merrill I Skolnik, when in 1987 he was head of the Radar Division, Naval Research Lab. Provides his early history.

Skolnik, Merrill I. Introduction to Radar Systems. 3rd ed. New York: McGraw-Hill, 2002.

Skolnik, Merrill I. Radar Handbook. 3rd ed. New York: McGraw Hill, 2008.

Skolnik, Merrill I. "Radar." Encyclopædia Britannica. Chicago, IL: Encyclopædia Britannica, 2002. Encyclopædia Britannica. Encyclopædia Britannica. Web. 6 Apr. 2014. <http://www.britannica.com/EBchecked/topic/488278/radar>.

People associated with radar
1927 births
Members of the United States National Academy of Engineering
MIT Lincoln Laboratory people
Johns Hopkins University alumni